The Melody at Night, with You is a solo album by American pianist Keith Jarrett recorded at his home studio in 1998 and released by ECM Records in 1999. It was recorded during his bout with chronic fatigue syndrome and was dedicated to Jarrett's second and then-wife, Rose Anne: "For Rose Anne, who heard the music, then gave it back to me".

In an interview in Time magazine in November 1999, he explained 

The album contains eight jazz standards, two traditional songs, and, uncharacteristically for Jarrett, only one improvisation ("Meditation", the second half of track six).

Reception 

The album was very successful commercially, becoming one of the best-selling jazz instrumental albums of the 2000s, and winning a number of awards; The second track, "I Got It Bad (and That Ain't Good)", was nominated for the 2001 Grammy Award for Best Jazz Instrumental Solo.

The critical reception was more mixed, however, with some critics praising its intimacy, while others criticized its simplicity. On the negative side, the Allmusic review by Richard S. Ginell awarded the album 2½ stars (out of 5) and states, "these performances lack color, contrast and life; and while you pull for Jarrett to summon the energy to make music again, the results are touching for a while but soon pall".

On the positive side, it was ranked the #2 Jazz album in the Down Beat "Critics Poll 2000", and Entertainment Weekly rated it an "A". The authors of The Penguin Guide to Jazz awarded the album 4 stars, calling it "a record of fragile magnificence, a sequence of filigreed songs from a common musical past... It is a quite simply magnificent record, swinging in a way that Jarrett has rarely before been swinging... and sweetly melodic." Writing for DownBeat, John Ephland commented: "the playing on this solo-piano recording is subdued, but does not lack for earnestness, passion or focus. The music is exquisite, unnerving and disarming, as the virtuoso bypasses flourish, instead choosing to speak plainly."

Track listing 
All tracks are jazz standards or traditional songs (5 & 9), by other composers, except the second half of track 6 ("Meditation"), which is an improvisation by Jarrett:

 "I Loves You, Porgy" (George Gershwin, Ira Gershwin, Dubose Heyward) - 5:50
 "I Got It Bad (and That Ain't Good)" (Duke Ellington, Paul Francis Webster) - 7:10
 "Don't Ever Leave Me" (Oscar Hammerstein II, Jerome Kern) - 2:47
 "Someone to Watch over Me" (Gershwin, Gershwin) - 5:05
 "My Wild Irish Rose" (Traditional) - 5:21
 "Blame It on My Youth/Meditation" (Edward Heyman, Oscar Levant/Jarrett) - 7:19
 "Something to Remember You By" (Howard Dietz, Arthur Schwartz) - 7:15
 "Be My Love" (Nicholas Brodszky, Sammy Cahn) - 5:38
 "Shenandoah" (Traditional) - 5:52
 "I'm Through With Love" (Gus Kahn, Fud Livingston, Matty Malneck) - 2:56

Personnel 
 Keith Jarrett – piano

Production
 Manfred Eicher – producer
 Keith Jarrett – producer, engineer
 Sascha Kleis – design
 Daniela Nowitzki – cover photography
 Rose Anne Jarrett – liner photography

References

External links 
 "The Melody at Night, With You" – review in All About Jazz, Glenn Astarita, November 1, 1999
 "The Melody at Night, With You" – review in All About Jazz, David Adler, December 1, 1999
 Keith Jarrett, "The Melody at Night, With You", ECM Records – review in JazzTimes, Doug Ramsey, January/February 2000
 ECM 1675 – publisher page (Album background)
 Transcriptions
 "My Wild Irish Rose", transcribed by Evilásio Vilar
 "Shenandoah", transcribed by Douglas Gould
 Keith Jarrett Transcriptions Project, Transcriptions
 "I Loves You Porgy", transcribed by Walther Sell
 "Don't Ever Leave Me", transcribed by 
 "Someone to Watch Over Me", anonymous transcription
 "Shenandoah", transcribed by Douglas Gould

ECM Records albums
Keith Jarrett albums
1999 albums
Albums produced by Manfred Eicher
Instrumental albums
Solo piano jazz albums